The George Eastman Award for distinguished contribution to the art of film was established by the George Eastman Museum in 1955 as the first film award given by an American archive and museum to honor artistic work of enduring value.

The award was first presented in 1955 to actors, actresses, directors, and cinematographers from the early years of silent film (1915–1925), and in 1957 to artists from the final years of the silent film era (1926–1930). The early recipients included Charles Chaplin, Mary Pickford, Joan Crawford, Frank Capra, and Gary Cooper.

The George Eastman Award later evolved to recognize a broader range of artistic talent in the film industry, from George Cukor and Fred Astaire to Martin Scorsese and Meryl Streep. The award ceremony was originally held at Eastman Theatre in Rochester and now takes place in the Eastman Museum's Dryden Theatre.

Award recipients

Actors/Actresses

Directors

Cinematographers

References

American film awards